Rullo is an Italian surname. Notable people with the surname include:

Erminio Rullo (born 1984), Italian footballer
Jason Rullo (born 1972), American drummer
Jerry Rullo (1923–2016), American basketball player
Joe Rullo (1916–1969), American baseball player
Marco Rullo (born 1976), Italian cyclist

Italian-language surnames